RX J0852.0−4622 (also known as G266.2−1.2) is a supernova remnant. The remnant is located in the southern sky in the constellation Vela ("sail"), and sits (in projection) inside the much larger and older Vela Supernova Remnant. For this reason, RX J0852.0−4622 is often referred to as Vela Junior (Vela Jr.).

It was found in 1998 when gamma ray emissions from the decay of 44Ti nuclei were discovered using the Imaging Compton Telescope (COMPTEL).

The distance to this object is controversial, but some scientists argue that the supernova remnant is only about 650–750 light-years away, and exploded comparatively recently (as seen from Earth), perhaps within the last 800 years. If the remnant is indeed young and nearby, its corresponding supernova should have been visible from the Earth around 1271 CE. Written accounts from Japan in late 1271 CE and early 1272 CE describe what may have been sightings of the supernova over the horizon near Kamakura, Japan in the early-morning hours of 13 September 1271. 

The central compact object (CCO) was discovered in 2001. In the initial Chandra X-ray image and deeper images thereafter, no pulsations were detected from the compact remnant, which is believed to be the neutron star CXOU J085201.4-461753.

References

External links
 
 

Gum Nebula
Supernova remnants
Vela (constellation)
ROSAT objects